is a Japanese voice actor. He works on eroge, under the name .

Filmography

Anime
2000
Platinumhugen Ordian (Yuu Kananase)
2001
Dennō Bōkenki Webdiver (Draguon)
Pocket Monster (Minaki)
Geneshaft (Sergei IV Sneak)
2002
Naruto (Shino Aburame)
2003
Bobobo-bo Bo-bobo (Kodebun)
.hack//Legend of the Twilight Bracelet (Daisuke)
Zatch Bell! (Sebé)
Naruto (Bisuke)
Rockman.EXE Axess (ColdMan)
2004
Bobobo-bo Bo-bobo (Puppet Lad)
Daphne in the Brilliant Blue (Chang)
School Rumble (Haruki Hanai)
Sexfriend (Takabe Tomohiro) (credited as Wasshoi Taro)
Rockman.EXE Stream (ColdMan)
2005
Akahori Gedou Hour Rabuge (Campbell Robot)
Bobobo-bo Bo-bobo (Sonic)
MÄR (Ian)
Starship Operators (Kouki Sakakibara)
Rockman.EXE Beast (DiveMan)
2006
Lemon Angel Project (Hitoshi Katagiri)
Rockman.EXE Beast+ (DiveMan)
2007
Naruto: Shippuden (Shino Aburame)
Bokurano: Ours (Masamitsu Seki)
Buso Renkin (Gouta Nakamura)
Nodame Cantabile (Ryutaro Mine)
Minami-ke series (Haruo Minami)
Yu-Gi-Oh! Duel Monsters GX (Makoto Inotsume)
Tales of Symphonia: The Animation (Magnius)
Major (manga) (Katori)
2009
Taishō Baseball Girls (Banboku Takahara)
Asura Cryin' (Tokiya Kagayaki)
2010
Bakuman (Yoshihisa Heishi)
Katanagatari (Kawauso Maniwa)
Ladies versus Butlers! (Tōichirō Kazamatsur)
2011
Bakuman 2 (Yoshihisa Heishi)
Dream Eater Merry (Guricho)
2013
Attack on Titan (Auruo Bossard)
2014
Black Bullet (Hidehiko Gadō)
JoJo's Bizarre Adventure: Stardust Crusaders (Rubber Soul)
Marvel Disk Wars: The Avengers (Peter Parker / Spider-Man)
Nagi-Asu: A Lull in the Sea (Satoru Mihashi)
2015
Attack on Titan: Junior High (Auruo Bossard)
Food Wars!: Shokugeki no Soma (Yuya Tomita)
Shimoneta (Masashi Endou)
Shirobako (Hisamitsu Isokawa)
2016
Active Raid (Daisuke Misaki)
Macross Delta (Chuck Mustang)
2017
Altair: A Record of Battles (Tesisat-Kapı Saruça)
The Ancient Magus' Bride (Yuuki Hatori)
2018
Back Street Girls: Gokudols (George)
Banana Fish (Shunichi Ibe)
Dragon Pilot: Hisone and Masotan (Shingo Maezawa)
Grand Blue (Toshio Kotegawa)
2019
Fairy Gone (Axel Rabū)
Boogiepop and Others (Seiji Kirima)
2020
Made in Abyss Movie 3: Dawn of the Deep Soul (Gueira)

Unknown date
Saint Seiya: The Lost Canvas (Thanatos)

Video games
Tales of Symphonia (2003) (Magnius)
Suikoden IV (2004) (Eugene, Lo Hak)
Tatsunoko vs. Capcom: Cross Generation of Heroes/Tatsunoko vs. Capcom: Ultimate All-Stars (2008) (Viewtiful Joe)
Blaze Union: Story to Reach the Future (2010) (Jenon)
Spider-Man: Shattered Dimensions (2010) (Amazing Spider-Man)
Gloria Union (2011) (Minnesota Grey)
The Great Ace Attorney: Adventures (2015) (Sherlock Holmes)
Gundam Breaker 3 (2016) (Yūichi)
The Great Ace Attorney 2: Resolve (2017) (Sherlock Holmes)
Mega Man 11 (2018) (Tundra Man)
Starlink: Battle for Atlas (2019) (Mason Rana)

Drama CDs
Amai Yuuten (????) (Yuuji Kawahara)
Tsurezure (????) (Settsu)

Dubbing

Live-action
Jim Sturgess
Across the Universe (Jude)
21 (Ben Campbell)
The Way Back (Janusz Wieszczek)
One Day (Dexter Mayhew)
Richard Madden
Game of Thrones (Robb Stark)
Ibiza (Leo West)
Rocketman (John Reid)
Eternals (Ikaris)
3 Idiots (Raju Rastogi (Sharman Joshi))
The Autopsy of Jane Doe (Austin Tilden (Emile Hirsch))
Awake (Clay Beresford, Jr. (Hayden Christensen))
Back to the Future (2014 BS Japan edition) (Goldie Wilson (Donald Fullilove))
The Boy in the Striped Pyjamas (Kurt Kotler (Rupert Friend))
Constantine (Chas Kramer (Shia LaBeouf))
Cruella (Jeffrey (Andrew Leung))
Dragon Tiger Gate (Turbo Shek (Shawn Yue))
The Finest Hours (Ray Sybert (Casey Affleck))
Hail, Caesar! (Hobie Doyle (Alden Ehrenreich))
Jason Bourne (Aaron Kalloor (Riz Ahmed))
Joy Ride 2: Dead Ahead (Nik Parker (Kyle Schmid))
Kung Fu Dunk (Ting Wei (Chen Bolin))
The Marine 2 (Joe Linwood (Ted DiBiase Jr.))
Midway (Lieutenant Roy Pearce (Alexander Ludwig))
Nikita (Seymour Birkhoff (Aaron Stanford))
The Other Guys (Detective Terry Hoitz (Mark Wahlberg))
Paranormal Activity: The Ghost Dimension (Ryan Fleege (Chris J. Murray))
Reasonable Doubt (Mitch Brockden (Dominic Cooper))
Ruby Sparks (Calvin Weir-Fields (Paul Dano))
The Schouwendam 12 (Pim Nijboer (Matthijs van de Sande Bakhuyzen))
Small Apartments (Bernard Franklin (James Marsden))
Stop-Loss (PFC Tommy Burgess (Joseph Gordon-Levitt))
Sungkyunkwan Scandal (Moon Jae-shin (Yoo Ah-in))
Tom-Yum-Goong (Johnny (Johnny Trí Nguyễn))
Triple Threat (Long Fei (Tiger Chen))
Vampires Suck (Edward Sullen (Matt Lanter))
Vincent N Roxxy (Vincent (Emile Hirsch))
Westworld (William (Jimmi Simpson))
X-Men: The Last Stand (Warren Worthington III / Angel (Ben Foster))

Animated
Batman: The Brave and the Bold (Plastic Man)
D.I.C.E. (Marco Rocca)
OK K.O.! Let's Be Heroes (Raymond)
Starship Troopers: Invasion (Bugspray)
Ultimate Spider-Man (Peter Parker/Spider-Man)

References

External links
  Shinji Kawada at Ken Production
 

Male voice actors from Tochigi Prefecture
Japanese male video game actors
Japanese male voice actors
Living people
1971 births
21st-century Japanese male actors
Ken Production voice actors